Milivoj Bračun (born 22 April 1958) is a Croatian football manager and former player who was most recently the manager of Slovenian First League side FC Koper.

Born in Zagreb, SR Croatia, back then within Yugoslavia, Bračun played for Dinamo Zagreb, Red Star Belgrade and Elche CF.

Club career
In the summer of 1986, after six seasons with Dinamo Zagreb, Bračun's contract at Maksimir expired. Since he wasn't offered a new one by head coach Ćiro Blažević, the 28-year-old defender principally agreed his transfer to Hajduk Split. However, later on in the summer transfer window veteran defender Luka Peruzović came back to the club, making Bračun's potential move surplus to requirements. Instead, Bračun accepted an offer from Red Star's sporting director Dragan Džajić and moved to Belgrade.

Coaching
Bračun has managed the youth team of GNK Dinamo Zagreb and the senior teams of NK Istra Pula, NK Segesta Sisak, NK Hrvatski Dragovoljac, NK Pula SČ, FC Koper, NK Olimpija Ljubljana, NK Zagreb, NK Rijeka and NK Inter Zaprešić.

References

External links
 Player profile at Weltfußball.de  
 

1958 births
Living people
Footballers from Zagreb
Association football defenders
Yugoslav footballers
GNK Dinamo Zagreb players
Red Star Belgrade footballers
Elche CF players
Yugoslav First League players
La Liga players
Segunda División players
Yugoslav expatriate footballers
Expatriate footballers in Spain
Yugoslav expatriate sportspeople in Spain
Croatian football managers
HNK Segesta managers
NK Hrvatski Dragovoljac managers
FC Koper managers
NK Zagreb managers
NK Olimpija Ljubljana (1945–2005) managers
NK Istra 1961 managers
HNK Rijeka managers
NK Inter Zaprešić managers
NK Slaven Belupo managers
Croatian expatriate football managers
Expatriate football managers in Slovenia
Croatian expatriate sportspeople in Slovenia